A teen idol is a celebrity who is widely idolized by teenagers.

Teen Idol may also refer to:
 Teen Idol (novel), a 2004 novel by Meg Cabot
 Teen Idols, a pop punk group
 The Teen Idles, a hardcore band

See also
 Teen Age Idol, 1962 song by Rick Nelson
 Confessions of a Teen Idol, 2009 American reality TV series